The Statue of Robert Baden-Powell is a granite carving of Robert Baden-Powell, the founder of Scouting, at Baden-Powell House in Queen's Gate, South Kensington, London, England. The statue was created by the English sculptor Don Potter in 1960 and was installed and unveiled in 1961. It now stands in Gilwell Park, the home of Scouting, following the sale of Baden-Powell House in 2021.

Background
The statue is made from Cornish granite, which is rare because granite is a difficult material to work with. At the time (1961), it was the only granite statue in  London. Potter had been involved in the Scouting movement and Baden-Powell had been a patron of his, commissioning carved totem poles from him. Baden-Powell's arms are crossed in front of his waist. His left hand rests upon a walking stick or tree branch; his right hand rests upon his left wrist. His campaign hat is tucked behind his right elbow, the brim held by the thumb and forefinger of his left hand. Below his neckerchief is his Bronze Wolf medal.

The statue was unveiled on 12 July 1961 by Prince Henry, Duke of Gloucester, who was the President of the Scouts. The inscription on the plaque at the sculpture's base reads:

See also
Scouting memorials
Baden-Powell grave

References

External links

1961 establishments in the United Kingdom
1960 sculptures
Granite sculptures in the United Kingdom
Monuments and memorials in the United Kingdom
Outdoor sculptures in the United Kingdom
Sculptures of men in the United Kingdom
Statues in London
Scouting monuments and memorials